The Arrondissement of Veurne is one of the eight administrative arrondissements in the Province of West Flanders, Belgium. It is both an administrative and a judicial arrondissement. However, the Judicial Arrondissement of Veurne also comprises all municipalities in the Arrondissement of Diksmuide.

Municipalities

Administrative Arrondissement
The Administrative Arrondissement of Veurne consists of the following municipalities:
Alveringem
De Panne
Koksijde
Nieuwpoort
Veurne

Judicial Arrondissement

The Judicial Arrondissement of Veurne consists of the municipalities of the Administrative Arrondissements of Veurne and Diksmuide.
Alveringem (Veurne)
De Panne (Veurne)
Diksmuide (Diksmuide)
Houthulst (Diksmuide)
Koekelare (Diksmuide)
Koksijde (Veurne)
Kortemark (Diksmuide)
Lo-Reninge (Diksmuide)
Nieuwpoort (Veurne)
Veurne (Veurne)

References 

Veurne